The 2018 Richmond Kickers season was the club's 26th season of existence. It was also the club's 11th season playing in the second tier of American soccer, and their seventh straight season in the United Soccer League, since renamed the USL Championship.

The Kickers failed to improve on their 2017 campaign, and saw the team failed to qualify for the playoffs for consecutive seasons for the first time in club history. It was the fourth season in the club's history where they failed to qualify for the postseason. The Kickers finished with six wins, their fewest since 1994, and 24 losses, their most ever. During the season, the Kickers saw their long-time head coach, Leigh Cowlishaw step down from the post, and David Bulow take up coaching duties for the second half of the 2018 season.

On September 11, 2018, the Kickers announced that due to financial issues associated with competing in the main USL, they would self-relegate themselves and become a founding member of USL League One, a new third-tier professional league operated by USL's parent company, United Soccer League (not to be confused with the former name of its top league).

Background 

The club is looking to improve off of a historically poor season. During the 2017 campaign, the Kickers finished with an 8–16–8 record, causing them to miss the playoffs for the first time since 2003. The Kickers amassed a club low 25 goals in the 32-match season. The club finished 14th out of 15 teams in the USL's Eastern Conference, and finished 26th in the 30-team league. The Kickers also suffered a second round exit in the U.S. Open Cup, losing to amateur outfit, Christos FC. It was the Kickers' shortest spell in the Open Cup since 2009.

Roster 

As of March 16, 2018.

Transfers

In

Out

Loan in

Non-competitive

Preseason friendlies

Midseason friendlies

Competitive

USL

Table

Results

U.S. Open Cup

Statistics

Appearances and goals 

|- 
|}

Top scorers

Awards

USL Team of the Week

See also 
 Richmond Kickers
 2018 in American soccer
 2018 USL season

References

External links 
Richmond Kickers Official Website

Richmond Kickers seasons
Richmond Kickers
Richmond Kickers
Richmond Kickers